"All to Myself" is a song recorded by American country music duo Dan + Shay. It is the third single from their 2018 self-titled album. Duo members Dan Smyers and Shay Mooney wrote the song with Jordan Reynolds and Nicolle Galyon; Smyers also co-produced the song with Scott Hendricks.

Content and history
The duo released the song to country radio on February 11, 2019, as the third single from their self-titled third studio album. The duo's members, Dan Smyers and Shay Mooney, co-wrote the song with Nicolle Galyon and Jordan Reynolds.

Billy Dukes of Taste of Country said of the song's composition that "Snaps and a thin guitar lick introduce Shay Mooney's vocals before a more robust and organic arrangement powers the song, starting at the chorus." The lyrics tell of a man's desire to have his lover "all to [him]self".

Commercial performance
The song was certified double-Platinum on July 22, 2020. It has sold 123,000 copies in the United States as of September 2019.

It reached the top of the Billboard Country Airplay chart dated August 24, 2019, becoming Dan + Shay's sixth Number One hit.

Music video
The video for the song was directed by Patrick Tracy and was released in April 2019. Using the theme of shadows, it shows the duo (who are never seen together) performing the song in a dark room, while shadows (which are pieces of paper with the song's lyrics cut into them) as well as shadows of people making out appear on a wall in the same room.

Charts

Weekly charts

Year-end charts

Certifications

References

2018 songs
2019 singles
Country ballads
2010s ballads
Dan + Shay songs
Songs written by Dan Smyers
Songs written by Shay Mooney
Songs written by Nicolle Galyon
Warner Records singles
Song recordings produced by Scott Hendricks
Songs written by Jordan Reynolds